is a 1952 Japanese film directed by Teinosuke Kinugasa. It was entered into the 1953 Cannes Film Festival.

Cast
 Shinobu Araki as Ryōben
 Kōtarō Bandō
 Kazuo Hasegawa as Kunihito Tateto
 Sumiko Hidaka as Morime Ōmiya
 Tatsuya Ishiguro
 Ryōsuke Kagawa
 Toshiaki Konoe
 Kanji Koshiba
 Yataro Kurokawa as Nakamaro Fujiwara
 Machiko Kyō as Mayame
 Mitsuko Mito as Sakuyako Tachibana
 Shozo Nanbu
 Shintarō Nanjō
 Joji Oka as Naramaro Tachibana
 Denjirō Ōkōchi as Gyōki
 Sakae Ozawa as Kimimaro Kuninaka
 Mitsusaburō Ramon as Sakamaro
 Taiji Tonoyama
 Kenjiro Uemura as Shōnan Shinjō

See also
Depictions of Gautama Buddha in film

References

External links

1952 films
1950s Japanese-language films
Japanese black-and-white films
Films directed by Teinosuke Kinugasa
Films about Buddhism
History of Japan on film
Films set in Nara Prefecture
Japanese drama films
1952 drama films
1950s Japanese films